Sr. Mary Margaret Funk, OSB, is an American writer and advocate of inter-religious dialogue. Her published works include a trilogy of books on "The Practice of the Spiritual Life".

In 1993 Funk spoke at the Parliament of the World's Religions. From 1994 to 2004, she was Executive Director of the Monastic Interreligious Dialogue Board, which coordinates the organization that aims to foster inter-religious and inter-monastic dialogue. In this capacity, she coordinated a number of events, including the Gethsemani Encounters and Benedict's Dharma Conference. In 1995 she traveled to India and Tibet on the 6th Spiritual Exchange Program.

A former Prioress and current member of Our Lady of Grace Monastery in Beech Grove, Indiana, which she entered in 1961, Funk directs the School of Lectio Divina at the adjacent Benedict Inn.

Books
Discernment Matters: Listening With the Ear of the Heart (2013)
Into the Depths: Memoirs of Bolivia (2011)
Lectio Matters: Before the Burning Bush: Through the Revelatory Texts of Scripture, Nature and Experience (2010)
Humility Matters: The Practice of the Spiritual Life (2005)
Tools Matter For Practicing the Spiritual Life (2004)
What Catholics Should Know About Islam (2004)
Islam Is: An Experience of Dialogue and Devotion (2003)
El Corazon En Paz: La Sabiduria de los Padres Del Desierto (2001)
Thoughts Matter: The Practice of the Spiritual Life (1999)
A Mind at Peace (1999)

Other works
 Into Iraq: Dispatches From an America at War; A Nun's Prayer (Letter to the Editor, New York Times, March 21, 2003.)

References

External links
  Personal Website
 University of Notre Dame Archives
 Monastic Dialogue
  About Sr. Meg
 A Monk's Chronicle
  Kylemore Abbey

Catholic ecumenical and interfaith relations
Benedictine nuns
People from Beech Grove, Indiana
Year of birth missing (living people)
Living people
People in interfaith dialogue
20th-century American Roman Catholic nuns
21st-century American Roman Catholic nuns